Olalekan Ibrahim Babatunde (born 29 December 1984) is a Nigerian professional footballer who plays as a striker for Swiss 4. Liga club FC Ravecchia.

Career
A striker, Babatunde began his career in Italy where he entered the youth system at Parma in 2008. After a brief stint with Arezzo, he made his Serie A debut in the 2002–03 season for Piacenza against his former club Parma, coming on as a 64th-minute substitute for Claudio Ferrarese in a 2–3 away loss at Stadio Ennio Tardini.

After only two appearances in Serie A, and three in the Serie B the following season, after Piacenza had suffered relegation, Babatunde had spells in Belgium, at Mons, and then in Malta, at Msida St. Joseph. At the latter, he was voted as the Malta Football Best Foreign Player award. In 2007, he signed with Danish Superliga club AC Horsens. He was first the subject of racist taunts in a match on 26 September 2007 against Næstved Boldklub. Babatunde was the subject of racism again in a friendly against Holstein Kiel in January 2018, when Kiel-player Peter Schyrba called him "an animal".

In 2008, Babatunde returned to Italy to play for Nocerina. With the Campania-based team he won the 2008–09 Serie D title and subsequent promotion to the Lega Pro Prima Divisione. Following an injury, he left the club in 2010.

In February 2011, Babatunde returned to Malta, reaching an agreement with Birkirkara. At the end of the season he left the club when his contract expired, and in March 2013, he joined Latvian Higher League champions Daugava and helped them win the Latvian Supercup. In September 2014 he moved to the Lebanese Premier League side Racing Beirut, before returning to Italy in 2015 playing for amateur clubs Saronno, Garda, Vedeggio, Novazzano and Real Melegnano the following years.

In July 2021, Babatunde made his footballing comeback signing for FC Locarno in the sixth-tier Swiss 2. Liga.

Honours
Daugava
Latvian Supercup: 2013

References

External links
Profile at Nigerianplayers.com

1984 births
Living people
Nigerian footballers
Association football forwards
Nigerian expatriate footballers
Parma Calcio 1913 players
Msida Saint-Joseph F.C. players
AC Horsens players
S.S. Arezzo players
Piacenza Calcio 1919 players
R.A.E.C. Mons players
FC Daugava players
Racing Club Beirut players
Serie A players
Serie B players
Serie C players
Serie D players
Belgian Pro League players
Danish Superliga players
Latvian Higher League players
Lebanese Premier League players
Nigerian expatriate sportspeople in Italy
Expatriate footballers in Italy
Nigerian expatriate sportspeople in Belgium
Expatriate footballers in Belgium
Nigerian expatriate sportspeople in Denmark
Expatriate men's footballers in Denmark
Nigerian expatriate sportspeople in Malta
Expatriate footballers in Malta
Nigerian expatriate sportspeople in Latvia
Expatriate footballers in Latvia
Nigerian expatriate sportspeople in Lebanon
Expatriate footballers in Lebanon
Yoruba sportspeople
Sportspeople from Lagos